FK506 binding protein 7 is a protein that in humans is encoded by the FKBP7 gene. The gene is also known as FKBP23 and PPIase. FKBP7 belongs to the FKBP-type peptidyl-prolyl cis/trans isomerase (PPIase) family. Members of this family exhibit PPIase activity and function as molecular chaperones. The orthologous protein in mouse is located in the endoplasmic reticulum and binds calcium.

Model organisms
Model organisms have been used in the study of FKBP7 function. A conditional knockout mouse line, called Fkbp7tm2a(KOMP)Wtsi was generated as part of the International Knockout Mouse Consortium program — a high-throughput mutagenesis project to generate and distribute animal models of disease to interested scientists — at the Wellcome Trust Sanger Institute.

Male and female animals underwent a standardized phenotypic screen to determine the effects of deletion.

Twenty three tests were carried out on mutant mice, but no significant abnormalities were observed.

References

Further reading 
 

Human proteins
Genes mutated in mice
EF-hand-containing proteins